Hamed Rezaei (was born 1983 in Urmia, West Azerbaijan) is a volleyball player from Iran, who plays as a Middle-blocker & Central defender for Shahrdari Urmia VC in Iranian Volleyball Super League. He was invited to the Men's National Team for the 2015 FIVB Volleyball World League.

References

Living people
Iranian men's volleyball players
People from Urmia
1983 births